Bill Vinovich III (born December 1, 1960) is an American football official in the National Football League (NFL) who has worked as an NFL referee from 2001 to 2006 and since 2012; he is also a college basketball official.

Early life
Vinovich was born in Beaver County, Pennsylvania. His family moved to California, where he played football through four years of college, transitioning to officiating upon his magna cum laude graduation in 1983 from the University of San Diego with a bachelor's degree in business administration with an emphasis in accounting. His paternal grandfather and father were also sports officials.

Officiating career
Vinovich began officiating football at the high school and small-college level; he then officiated in the Canadian Football League and Arena Football League, followed by the Mountain West Conference of NCAA Division I.

Vinovich began his career in the NFL as a side judge on the officiating crew headed by referees Dick Hantak (2001) and Ed Hochuli (2002–2003) before being promoted to referee for the start of the 2004 NFL season after former referee Ron Blum returned to his original position of line judge. In the NFL, he wears uniform number 52.

As a college basketball official, Vinovich officiated a first round contest between Virginia Tech and Illinois in the 2007 NCAA Division I men's basketball tournament on March 16, 2007.

Due to a heart condition, Bill Vinovich retired from field duty as an NFL official prior to the 2007 season, to serve as the replay official for Ed Hochuli.  He was replaced as a referee by former side judge John Parry.

In 2012, doctors gave Vinovich a clean bill of health, and he returned for the 2012 NFL season as a substitute official, working several games during the season. His first game back since 2006 was on October 14, 2012, heading Scott Green's crew in Philadelphia.

Vinovich was the referee of Super Bowl XLIX, played on February 1, 2015, at the University of Phoenix Stadium in Glendale, Arizona.  Before that, he was the alternate referee of Super Bowl XLVII, which was played in New Orleans on February 3, 2013. In addition, Vinovich has officiated nine other post-season games (listed here by NFL season): three conference championship games (2002 AFC, 2015 NFC, and 2018 NFC), four divisional playoff games (2003 NFC, 2012 AFC, 2014 AFC, and 2017 NFC), and two wild card playoff games (2006 AFC and 2013 NFC).

Vinovich was the referee for the 2018 NFC Championship Game, in which the lack of a penalty called on a controversial play late in the fourth quarter became the most discussed part of the game.

On January 15, 2020, Vinovich was announced as the referee for Super Bowl LIV, which took place on February 2, 2020.

Two years later, on January 25, 2022, the NFL named him as the alternate referee for Super Bowl LVI. He and his officiating crew joined the main officiating crew headed by main referee Ronald Torbert.

2022 Crew 

 R: Bill Vinovich
 U: Alex Moore
 DJ: Jerry Bergman
 LJ: Mark Perlman
 FJ: Joe Blubaugh
 SJ: Jimmy Buchanan
 BJ: Jimmy Russell
 RO: Mark Butterworth
 RA: Meddie Kalegi

Personal life
Outside of his officiating career, Vinovich works as a certified public accountant.

References

Further reading

1960 births
Living people
People from Beaver County, Pennsylvania
People from California
University of San Diego alumni
Canadian Football League people
College men's basketball referees in the United States
National Football League officials
American accountants